A. R. Rao (23 September 1908 – 4 April 2011) was a twentieth century Indian mathematician who popularized maths among youngsters.

Life
Rao was born on 23 September 1908 in Salem district. He studied B. Sc. from Presidency College, Madras and M. Sc. from Wilson College, Bombay. He joined Bahauddin College, Junagadh as a professor and made Gujarat his residence. After teaching for 27 years in Junagadh, he was transferred to Gujarat College, Ahmedabad. In 1964, he was appointed as a principal of Sir P. P. Institute of Science, Bhavnagar and he retired from it in 1976.

After his retirement from active academics, Rao joined the newly formed Vikram A. Sarabhai Community Science Centre (VASCSC) in Ahmedabad as head of the mathematics department. Here, I began to explore methods on popularizing maths through fun workshops and toys. He lived in Ahmedabad with his family, most of which continues to live in Ahmedabad and Thane.
Rao was interested in education, research, experimentation, problem solving and popularizing mathematics among the masses. He pioneered a mathematical laboratory at the Sarabhai center (posthumously renamed in his memory) in Ahmedabad. Here, he designed models and experiments to teach mathematics. He was also active in attempts to popularize mathematics in the state and in academics, and prepared students to participate in International Mathematical Olympiad .

Rao has written a number of books including Brain Sharpners, a book on mathematical puzzles.

He remained active till January 2011 and died at the age of 103 years on 22 October 2011 following a heart attack.

Recognition
He had received the national award from the Department of Science and Technology, Government of India. He was felicitated by National Board for Higher Mathematics, Indian Mathematical Association and Gujarat Ganit Mandal and received a prize of recognition from the President of India as well as the then Chief Minister of Gujarat Narendra Modi. The Gujarat Ganit Mandal has produced a documentary on him.

References

1908 births
2011 deaths
Indian centenarians
Scientists from Tamil Nadu
People from Salem district
20th-century Indian mathematicians